The 1910 Army Cadets football team represented the United States Military Academy in the 1910 college football season. In their third and final season under head coach Harry Nelly, the Cadets compiled a  record, shut out five of their eight opponents, and outscored all opponents by a combined total of 96 to 12 – an average of 12.0 points scored and 1.5 points allowed.  The Cadets' two losses came against 1910 national champion Harvard by a 6 to 0 score and to the Navy Midshipmen by a 3 to 0 score in the annual Army–Navy Game. 
 
Army's center Archibald Vincent Arnold was selected by sports writer, Wilton S. Farnsworth, of the New York Evening Journal as a first-team player on the All-America team. Arnold was also selected by The New York Times as a second-team All-American.

Schedule

References

Army
Army Black Knights football seasons
Army Cadets football